Gilbert Hotel is a 2003 solo album by Paul Gilbert formerly of the heavy metal band Racer X and the hard rock band Mr. Big. It was initially released as a bonus CD with his compilation album Paul the Young Dude/The Best of Paul Gilbert.

"Time to Let You Go" was originally recorded by Enuff Z'nuff on the album Strength.

Track listing
All songs written by Paul Gilbert except where noted.
"Three Times Rana" – 3:36
"Black Rain Cloud" – 3:56
"Escalator Music" (Instrumental) – 1:26 
"Lay Off the Morphine" – 2:54
"N.F.R.O." (Instrumental) – 0:56 (J. S. Bach) - Goldberg Variation No. 5 by J.S. Bach, played on acoustic guitar.
"Older Guy" – 2:49
"The Lamb Lies Down on Broadway" – 4:56 (Peter Gabriel, Steve Hackett, Tony Banks, Mike Rutherford, Phil Collins)
"Time to Let You Go" – 3:17 (Donnie Vie)
"W.T.R.O." (Instrumental) – 2:56 (J. S. Bach) - The Prelude in C major from J. S. Bach's "Well Tempered Clavier", played on acoustic guitar.
"Universal" – 2:24

Tracks 5 & 9 arranged by Paul Gilbert.

Personnel
Paul Gilbert – vocals, guitars, bass guitar, bongos, brushes and other things
Scott Coogan – drums (Track 1), percussion and vocals (Track 8)
Linus of Hollywood – guitars and vocals (Track 8)

Production
Assistant Producer – Warren Huart
Assistant Mixer – Warren Huart

External links
 Allmusic info

Paul Gilbert albums
2003 albums